Clemence Jackson Honyenuga (born 4 September 1952) was a Ghanaian judge. He is an active Justice of the Supreme Court of Ghana from 22 May 2020 until 4 September 2022.

Early life and education 
Honyenuga was born on 4 September 1953. He hails from Nyagbo-Gagbefe in the Volta Region of Ghana, he studied at the University of Ghana prior to entering legal practice.

Career 
He began as an Assistant State Attorney then later, a private legal practitioner. His career at the bench begun when he gained appointment as the Judge Advocate of the Ghana Navy. He served in this capacity prior to his call to the High Court bench. As a Justice of the High Court, he served as an additional High Court Judge adjudicating civil matters, narcotics, robbery, and other violent crimes. He was the Director of the Remand Prisoners Project prior to his call to the bench of the Court of Appeals. He is also the paramount chief of the Nyagbo Traditional Area.

Supreme Court appointment

Nomination
On 17 March 2020 the president, Nana Akufo-Addo informed the Speaker of Parliament, Mike Oquaye that consultations had been completed for the nomination of Justice Honyenuga and three other persons to be made justices of the Supreme Court of Ghana. The speaker of parliament announced his nomination together with the three others to parliament on 19 March 2020 for vetting and approval.

Vetting and endorsement allegations
Justice Honyenuga was vetted by parliament on Monday 11 May 2020. During the vetting process, he was questioned on his alleged endorsement of the president and the political party of the incumbent government; the New Patriotic Party. This allegation was due to a statement he made in a durbar of which he reportedly said; "with the vision of the President and the gains made in his first term, Ghanaians may consider giving him another four years." In his defence he said he, "did not endorse the presidency of Nana Addo Dankwa Akufo-Addo in his personal capacity but was a speech he was elected to read on behalf of the chiefs and people of Afadjato when the President visited the Volta region." He also apologised saying; "In reading that statement, we didn’t intend endorsing the president. Our understanding was that we were wishing him well… If out of political dissatisfaction some people are unhappy with whatever I am supposed to have said then I am sorry." The judge's statement made during the durbar was greeted with criticisms and was widely condemned. The Ghanaian journalist and political analyst, Kweku Baako described the alleged endorsement as an "unwarranted sycophancy". He also added that the judge had stained his reputation through the alleged endorsement and also opined that if he had the opportunity to advise the president on the matter, he would have told the president to "drop him". The Volta Regional Chairman of the National Democratic Congress (NDC), Henry Kwadzo Ametefe concurred saying the judge's alleged endorsement was a violation of the code of conduct of the judiciary and called on the Legal Council and the Chairman of the Judicial Council, the Chief Justice to take "appropriate action".

Approval and swearing in
Following his vetting by parliament, Honyenuga was approved by parliament on Wednesday 20 May 2020 and sworn into office on Friday 22 May 2020 with the president particularly congratulating him for his conduct and compartment during his vetting by parliament amidst the endorsement allegations. He was sworn in together with Justice Issifu Omoro Tanko Amadu.

See also
List of judges of the Supreme Court of Ghana
Supreme Court of Ghana

References

Justices of the Supreme Court of Ghana
21st-century Ghanaian judges
Living people
University of Ghana alumni
20th-century Ghanaian lawyers
1952 births